The Public Provident Fund (PPF) is a savings-cum-tax-saving instrument in India, introduced by the National Savings Institute of the Ministry of Finance in 1968. The main objective of the scheme is to mobilize small savings by offering an investment with reasonable returns combined with income tax benefits. The scheme is fully guaranteed by the Central Government.  Balance in the PPF account is not subject to attachment under any order or decree of court under the Government Savings Banks Act, 1873. However Income Tax & other Government authorities can attach the account for recovering tax dues.

The 2019 Public Provident Fund Scheme, introduced by the Government on 12 December 2019, resulted in the rescinding of the earlier 1968 Public Provident Fund Scheme.

Eligibility
Individuals who are residents of India are eligible to open their account under the Public Provident Fund, and are entitled to tax-free returns.

Non resident Indians
As of August 2018, according to the Indian Ministry of finance (Department of Economic Affairs), NRIs (Non resident Indians) are not allowed to open new PPF accounts. However, they are allowed to continue their existing PPF accounts up to its 15 years maturity period. An amendment to earlier rules allowing NRIs to invest in PPF was proposed in the 2018 Finance Bill, but has not yet been approved.

In October 2017, a notification was passed by the Ministry of Finance regarding an amendment to the PPF scheme of 1968, which would deem a PPF account closed from the day a person became a non resident. This led to much confusion. Subsequently, the ministry issued an office memorandum in February 2018 keeping the above notification in abeyance until any further order on this matter, thus the situation remained unchanged.

Investment and returns
A minimum yearly deposit of ₹500 is required to open and maintain a PPF account.  A PPF account holder can deposit a maximum of ₹1.5 lacs in his/her PPF account (including those accounts where he is the guardian) per financial year. There must be a guardian for PPF accounts opened in the name of minor children. Parents can act as guardians in such PPF accounts of minor children. Any amount deposited more than ₹1.5 lacs in a financial year will not earn any interest. The amount can be deposited in lump sum or in instalments per year. However, this does not mean a single deposit once in a month.

The Ministry of Finance, Government of India announces the rate of interest for PPF account every quarter. The interest compounded annually and paid in March every year. Interest is calculated on the lowest balance between the close of the fifth day and the last day of every month.

Interest rates 
1986–2016

2016–17

2017–18

2018–19

2019–20

2020–21

2021–22

2022–23

Duration of scheme
Original duration is 15 years. Thereafter it can either be closed and the entire amount can be withdrawn or on application by the subscriber, it can be extended for 1 or more blocks of 5 years each, with or without making further contributions.

PPF maturity options 
Subscriber has 3 options once the maturity period is over.

Complete withdrawal.
Extend the PPF account with no contribution – PPF account can be extended after the completion of 15 years, subscriber doesn't need to put any amount after the maturity. This is the default option meaning if subscriber doesn't take any action within one year of his PPF account maturity this option activates automatically. Any amount can be withdrawn from the PPF account if the option of extension with no contribution is chosen. Only restriction is only one withdrawal is permitted in a financial year. Rest of the amount keeps earning interest.
Extend the PPF account with contribution - With this option subscriber can put money in his PPF account after extension. If subscriber wants to choose this option then he needs to submit Form H in the bank where he is having a PPF account within one year from the date of maturity (before the completion of 16 yrs in PPF). With this option subscriber can only withdraw maximum 60% of his PPF amount (amount which was there in the PPF account at the beginning of the extended period) within the entire 5 yrs block. Every year only a single withdrawal is permitted.

Loans
Loan facility is available from 3rd financial year up to 5th financial year. The rate of interest charged on loan taken by the subscriber of a PPF account on or after 12 December 2019 shall be 1% more than the prevailing interest on PPF.

Public Provident Fund Scheme, 2019 has reduced the interest spread to 1 (one) percent form earlier spread of 2 percent.

Up to a maximum of 25 percent of the balance at the end of the 2nd immediately preceding year would be allowed as loan. Such withdrawals are to be repaid within 36 months.

A second loan could be availed as long as you are within the 3rd and before the 6th year, and only if the first one is fully repaid. Also note that once you become eligible for withdrawals, no loans would be permitted. Inactive accounts or discontinued accounts are not eligible for loan.

Features
The public provident fund is established by the central government. One can voluntarily open an account with any nationalized bank, selected authorized private bank or post office. The account can be opened in the name of individuals including minor.

The minimum amount is ₹500 which can be deposited.
The rate of interest at present is 7.1% per annum (as of April 2020).
Interest received is tax free.
The entire balance can be withdrawn on maturity.
The maximum amount which can be deposited every year is ₹150,000 in an account at present.
The interest earned on the PPF subscription is compounded annually. 
All the balance that accumulates over time is exempted from wealth tax.

Withdrawals from PPF account

There is a lock-in period of 15 years and the money can be withdrawn in full after its maturity period. However, pre-mature withdrawals can be made from the start of the seventh financial year. The maximum amount that can be withdrawn pre-maturely is equal to 50% of the amount that stood in the account at the end of 4th year preceding year or the end of immediately preceding year whichever is lower.

After 15 years of maturity, the full PPF amount can be withdrawn which is tax free, including the interest amount as well.

Nomination
Nomination facility is available in the name of one or more persons. The shares of nominees may also be defined by the subscriber.

PPF Penalty / Revival / Nomination 
If any contribution of minimum amount in any year is not invested, then the account will be deactivated. To activate the bearer needs to pay ₹50 as penalty for each inactive year. He/she also needs to deposit ₹500 each as each inactive year's contribution.

In case death of account holder then the balance amount will be paid to his nominee or legal heir even before 15 years. Nominees or legal heirs are not eligible to continue the account of the deceased.

If balance amount in the account of a deceased is higher than ₹150,000 then the nominee or legal heir has to prove the identity to claim the amount

Premature closure of PPF account
The Public Provident Fund (Amendment) Scheme, 2016 made changes in Paragraph 9, for sub-rule 3(C) of Public Provident Fund Scheme, 1968 to facilitate the premature closure of PPF Account. Premature closure of PPF account is permitted after completion of 5 years for medical treatment of family members and for higher education of PPF account holder. However, premature closure comes with an interest rate penalty of 1%.
As per GOI 12 December 2019 NOTIFICATIONS some new  rules for prematurely widrawal added 1. If change in residency have to  produce Visa and passport or ITR may be closed the account.2. Higher education of self or dependent on producing fee Bills or admissions confirm letter account may shut.rest rules are same as demise of holder or medical condition of self or dependent.

Transfer of PPF account
The account can be transferred to other branches/ other banks or Post Offices and vice versa upon request by the subscriber. The service is free of charges.

Step 1 – Approach the bank or post office branch where the PPF account is held and ask for the form for making the transfer. The bank or post office will provide you with a form which is to be filled.

Step 2 – The existing bank will then forward the certified copy of the account, the account opening application, nomination form, and specimen signature. It will also forward the cheque/dd for the outstanding amount in the PPF account to the new bank at the branch specified by the customer.

Step 3 – Once your bank receives these documents, the bank will inform you and ask you to submit a new PPF account opening form along with the old PPF passbook. You can also provide nominations for this new account. You will also be required to submit the KYC documents.

Step 4 – If you hold an internet banking facility with your bank, after a few weeks, check that the transferred PPF account now shows up under the PPF account tab/link in your login. If that is not the case, inquire the local bank branch.

PPF tax concessions

Annual contributions qualify for tax deduction under Section 80C of income tax as per the old Tax regime. The tax benefit is capped at ₹1.5 lacs per financial year.

PPF falls under EEE (Exempt, Exempt, Exempt) tax basket. Contribution to PPF account is eligible for tax benefit under Section 80C of the Income Tax Act in the old Tax Regime. Interest earned is exempt from income tax and maturity proceeds are also exempt from tax.

According to R.K. Mohapatra, General Manager-Finance, IRCON International, and author of the award-winning book ‘Retirement Planning: A Simple Guide for Individuals’, in the falling interest rate era, investment in PPF make senses for people who are in higher income tax brackets because of the advantages of exempt-exempt-exempt (EEE) scheme, which means they get tax deduction under Section 80C when they invest, and the accrual of interest as well as withdrawal is completely tax-free.

See also
 Equity-linked savings scheme
 National Pension System
 National Savings Certificates (India)

References

External links 

India Post. Ministry of Communications & Information Technology

Retirement in India
Tax-advantaged savings plans in India
Indian labour law